William Ivarson (March 9, 1867 – November 5, 1934) was a Norwegian actor.

Ivarson was born in Horten. From 1899 until his death, he was one of the leading actors at the National Theater in Bergen. Ivarson was an energetic and versatile character actor. Among his foremost roles were Sir Andrew Aguecheek in William Shakespeare's Twelfth Night, the title role in Ludvig Holberg's Jeppe on the Hill, Hjalmar Ekdal in Henrik Ibsen's The Wild Duck, and Celius in Nils Kjær's Det lykkelige valg.

Ivarson also appeared in several silent films. He was the father of the film director and screenwriter Harry Ivarson.

Filmography
 1919: Sons of Ingmar
 1920: The Parson's Widow

External links

References

19th-century Norwegian male actors
20th-century Norwegian male actors
People from Horten
1867 births
1934 deaths
Norwegian male stage actors
Norwegian male silent film actors